Te Rangiita or Te Rangi-ita may refer to:

Te Rangi-ita (Ngāti Tūwharetoa), a 17th century Māori chieftain and ancestor of Ngāti Te Rangiita
Te Rangiita, New Zealand, a settlement on the southeastern shore of Lake Taupō
Te Rangiita (whare), a marae in Nukuhau